Christian Alexander Schurr Voigt (born August 20, 1984) is a Mexican swimmer. At the 2012 Summer Olympics, he competed in the Men's 200 metre breaststroke, finishing in 26th place overall in the heats, failing to qualify for the semifinals.

Born in Washington, D.C., United States, he swam for the U.S. at the 2007 Pan American Games in Rio de Janeiro, where he won a gold medal in the Men's 4x100 metre medley relay by participating in heats. He also finished 6th in the Men's 100 metre breaststroke.

Notes

References

External links
 
 
 

1984 births
Living people
Mexican male swimmers
Mexican male breaststroke swimmers
Olympic swimmers of Mexico
Swimmers at the 2012 Summer Olympics
Pan American Games gold medalists for the United States
Pan American Games medalists in swimming
Swimmers at the 2007 Pan American Games
Medalists at the 2007 Pan American Games